Spiridon Niculescu (born 8 April 1943) is a Romanian former football goalkeeper and manager.

Honours
Argeș Pitești
Divizia A: 1971–72
Divizia B: 1962–63
Cupa României runner-up: 1964–65
Dinamo București
Cupa României: 1967–68

Notes

References

External links
Spiridon Niculescu player profile at Labtof.ro
Spiridon Niculescu manager profile at Labtof.ro

1943 births
Living people
Romanian footballers
Association football goalkeepers
Liga I players
Liga II players
FC Rapid București players
FC Argeș Pitești players
FC Dinamo București players
AFC Dacia Unirea Brăila players
Romanian football managers
FC Dunărea Călărași managers
CSM Flacăra Moreni managers
People from Ilfov County